Winwebsec is a category of malware that targets the users of Windows operating systems and produces fake claims as genuine anti-malware software, then demands payment to provide fixes to fictitious problems.

Winwebsec 
These are programs that generate misleading alerts and false detections in order to convince users to purchase illegitimate security software. Some of these programs, including Win32/Winwebsec, may display product names or logos of some well-known companies like Microsoft in an attempt to impersonate some genuine products of legitimate companies.

The software shows popup that claim to scan for malware, and displays fake warnings similar to:

They then show a message to the user that they need to pay money to activate the software in order to remove these threats which actually don’t exist. This malware may display a dialog that looks similar to Windows Security Center or it may have names like Live Security Platinum 
 or Security Shield. The GUI varies from variant to variant.

Microsoft security software detects and removes this family of threats.

Variants 
Smart Protection 2012
Smart Protection 2013
Smart Protection 2014
Security Sphere 2012
Security Sphere 2013
Security Sphere 2014
System Security
Winweb Security (where the family gets its name from)
Smart Security
Total Security
Security Tool
Security Shield
Security Scanner
System Tool
MS Removal Tool
Essential Cleaner
Win 7 Security System
Win 8 Security System
Win XP Security System
System Progressive Protection
Disk Antivirus Professional
System Care Antivirus
Live Security Platinum
Personal Shield Pro
AVASoft Antivirus Professional
AVASoft Professional Antivirus
Smart Fortress 2012
Smart Fortress 2013
Smart Fortress 2014
System Doctor 2012
System Doctor 2013
System Doctor 2014
Reimage Repair
Adware/AntiSpywarePro2009 
Adware/UltimateCleaner 
Adware/Xpantivirus2008 
AntiSpyware Pro 2009
AntiVirus2008
FakeAlert-AntiSpywarePro
FakeAlert-WinwebSecurity.gen

See also 
Rogue security software
Social engineering (security)
List of rogue security software
Scareware

References 

Computer security articles needing attention
Windows malware